Antonis Sapountzis (Greek: Αντώνης Σαπουντζής; born 19 November 1971) is a Greek former professional footballer who played as a midfielder.

During his club career, Sapountzis played for Eordaikos, Edessaikos, Aris Thessaloniki, Panionios, Iraklis, OFI Crete and Kerkyra.

Honours
Panionios
 Greek Cup: 1997–98

References

Greek footballers
Iraklis Thessaloniki F.C. players
Aris Thessaloniki F.C. players
Panionios F.C. players
OFI Crete F.C. players
Edessaikos F.C. players
A.O. Kerkyra players
Association football midfielders
1971 births
Living people
Footballers from Edessa, Greece